The bird genus Apus comprise some of the Old World members of the family Apodidae, commonly known as swifts.

They are among the fastest birds in the world. They resemble swallows, to which they are not related, but have shorter tails and sickle-shaped wings.  Swifts spend most of their life aloft, have very short legs and use them mostly to cling to surfaces.

Taxonomy
The genus Apus was erected by the Italian naturalist Giovanni Antonio Scopoli in 1777 based on tautonymy and the common swift which had been given the binomial name Hirundo apus by the  Swedish naturalist Carl Linnaeus in 1758. The name Apus is Latin for a swift, thought by the ancients to be a type of swallow with no feet (from Ancient Greek  α, a, "without", and πούς, pous, "foot").

Before the 1950s, there was some controversy over which group of organism should have the genus name Apus. In 1801, Bosc gave the small crustacean organisms, known today as Triops, the genus name Apus, and later authors continued to use this term. Keilhack suggested (in 1909) that this was incorrect since there was already an avian genus named Apus by Scopoli in 1777 . It was not until 1958 that the controversy finally ended when the International Commission on Zoological Nomenclature (ICZN) ruled against the use of the genus name Apus for the crustaceans and instead recognized the term Triops.

Species

The genus contains 20 species:

 Cape Verde swift, Apus alexandri
 Common swift, Apus apus
 Plain swift, Apus unicolor
 Nyanza swift, Apus niansae
 Pallid swift, Apus pallidus
 African black swift, Apus barbatus
 Malagasy black swift, Apus balstoni
 Fernando Po swift Apus sladeniae
 Forbes-Watson's swift, Apus berliozi
 Bradfield's swift, Apus bradfieldi
 Pacific swift, Apus pacificus
 Salim Ali's swift, Apus salimalii
 Blyth's swift, Apus leuconyx
 Cook's swift, Apus cooki
 Dark-rumped swift, Apus acuticauda
 Little swift, Apus affinis
 House swift, Apus nipalensis
 Horus swift, Apus horus
 White-rumped swift, Apus caffer
 Bates's swift Apus batesi

Known fossil species are:
Apus gaillardi (Middle/Late Miocene of La Grive-St.-Alban, France)
Apus wetmorei (Early - Late Pliocene? of SC and SE Europe)
Apus baranensis (Late Pliocene of SE Europe)
Apus submelba (Middle Pleistocene of Slovakia)

The Miocene "Apus" ignotus is now placed in Procypseloides.

References

 
Bird genera
Taxa named by Giovanni Antonio Scopoli